Gloria Gracia Wong Sze is a Malaysian para table tennis player. She get gold medal in 2021 Asian Youth Para Games.

References 

Living people
People from Sarawak
Malaysian people of Chinese descent
Year of birth missing (living people)